Joaquin G. Bernas SJ (July 7, 1932 – March 6, 2021) was a Jesuit priest, lawyer, college professor and writer who was Dean Emeritus of the Ateneo de Manila Law School in Makati, Philippines. He was a member of the 1986 Constitutional Commission which drafted the 1987 Philippine Constitution.

Bernas specialized in the Philippine Constitution and was an author of law books and articles.

Education
Bernas earned his Bachelor of Arts degree in English, Latin, and Greek Classics and Master of Arts degree in Philosophy from Berchmans College in 1956 and 1957 respectively. In 1962, he received his Bachelor of Laws degree from Ateneo de Manila Law School and placed 9th in the bar examinations given that year. 
He also entered the Society of Jesus in 1950 and ordained as a priest in 1965.

Bernas had a Licentiate of Sacred Theology from Woodstock College in 1966, Master of Laws and Doctor of Juridical Science from New York University in 1965 and 1968, respectively.

Career
Bernas began teaching at Ateneo de Manila Law School in 1966. He served as dean twice during 1972 to 1976 and 2000 to 2004 and president of Ateneo de Manila University during 1984 to 1993. Upon his retirement as Law Dean in 2004, Bernas was conferred the position of Dean Emeritus at Ateneo School of Law. He continued to teach Constitutional Law and Public International Law to law freshmen and sophomores.

He was a member of the Constitutional Commission formed by President Corazon Aquino in 1986, a Provincial Superior of the Society of Jesus in the Philippines during 1976 to 1982, rector of the Jesuit Residence during 1994 to 2000 and a director of the Philippine Stock Exchange.

Later life and death
Bernas was confined at The Medical City for six weeks due to an infection and was discharged from the hospital on March 4, 2021.
Bernas died at the Ateneo Jesuit Residence inside the Ateneo de Manila University campus in Quezon City on March 6, 2021. He died at the age of 88.

Publications
The Intent of the 1986 Constitution Writers (1995)
The 1987 Constitution of the Republic of the Philippines: A Commentary (1996)
Constitutional Structure and Powers of Government: Notes and Cases (1997)
A Living Constitution: The Ramos Presidency (1999)
A Living Constitution: The Cory Aquino Presidency (2000)
"From One-Man Rule to People Power" (2001)
An Introduction to Public International Law (2002)
A Living Constitution: The Abbreviated Estrada Presidency (2003)
Constitutional Rights and Social Demands: Notes and Cases (2004)
The 1987 Constitution of the Philippines: A Comprehensive Reviewer (2006)
A Living Constitution: The Troubled Arroyo Presidency (2007)
A Living Constitution: Constitutional Issues Arising During the Troubled Gloria Arroyo Presidency Part II (2010)

References

External links
Fr. Bernas

1932 births
2021 deaths
Ateneo de Manila University alumni
Academic staff of Ateneo de Manila University
Filipino academic administrators
20th-century Filipino Jesuits
Filipino journalists
20th-century Filipino lawyers
Deans of law schools in the Philippines
People from Baao, Camarines Sur
People from Quezon City
Presidents of universities and colleges in the Philippines
Woodstock College alumni
Members of the Philippine Constitutional Commission of 1986